Asghar is a Persian name and may refer to:

Given name
 Asghar Ali (cricketer, born 1971), United Arab Emirates cricketer
 Asghar Ali (cricketer, born 1924) (1924–1979), cricketer in India from 1943 to 1949, and in Pakistan from 1949 to 1957
 Ali Asghar Bazri, Iranian wrestler
 Asghar Ali Engineer, Indian civil engineer, Islamic scholar, and religious figure
 Asghar Farhadi, Iranian film director and screenwriter
 Ali al-Asghar ibn Husayn, the youngest child of Husayn ibn Ali
 Asghar Khan, Pakistani Air Force veteran fighter pilot and politician
 Asghar Qadir, Pakistani mathematician and scientist in the field of cosmology
 Asghar Afghan, Afghan cricketer

Surname
 Mohammad Asghar, Welsh politician
 Mohammad Asghar (cricketer), Pakistani Cricketer
 Natasha Asghar, Welsh politician
 Sohail Asghar (1954-2021), Pakistani actor

Arabic masculine given names